Gamasodes is a genus of mites in the family Parasitidae.

Species
 Gamasodes aequipilis Athias-Henriot, 1980     
 Gamasodes bispinosus (Halbert, 1915)     
 Gamasodes buettikeri Samsinak, 1979     
 Gamasodes bulgatus Athias-Henriot, 1980     
 Gamasodes coprophilus Chelebiev, 1980     
 Gamasodes corniculans Athias-Henriot, 1978     
 Gamasodes diceras Athias-Henriot, 1980     
 Gamasodes guoluoensis Gu & Liu, 1995     
 Gamasodes inermis Athias-Henriot, 1978     
 Gamasodes marmotae Ma, 1992     
 Gamasodes miliaris Athias-Henriot, 1980     
 Gamasodes nudus Tseng, 1995     
 Gamasodes plenigranosus Athias-Henriot, 1980     
 Gamasodes simplex Athias-Henriot, 1978     
 Gamasodes sinicus Tian & Gu, 1991     
 Gamasodes spinipes (C.L.Koch, 1841)     
 Gamasodes tongdensis Li, Yang & Chen, 1999     
 Gamasodes viretianus Athias-Henriot, 1980

References

Parasitidae